Liberty is a small unincorporated community in Kittitas County, Washington, United States. Following the discovery of gold in Swauk creek in 1873, Liberty was one of several gold-mining camps that sprang up.  The Swauk creek discovery is notable for producing specimens of crystalline gold.

Liberty was formerly known as Williams Creek.  It was given its name in 1892 by Gus Nelson.

Liberty was added to the National Register of Historic Places in 1974.

Buildings in Liberty Historical District

Buildings contributing to the designation of Liberty Historical District include:

Hotel and boarding house: a two-story woodframe structure built in the 1890s.
Grocery store: a one-story woodframe structure built in the 1890s.
Butcher shop: a one-story woodframe structure built in 1894.
Log house: built in the 1890s by miners and moved from the Old Liberty Mine in 1944.
Stage office: a one-room structure built in the 1890s.

References

External links

Many photos of the Liberty Historic District.

Unincorporated communities in Kittitas County, Washington
Unincorporated communities in Washington (state)
National Register of Historic Places in Kittitas County, Washington
Buildings and structures completed in 1873